Gerhard Kerschbaumer (born 19 July 1991) is an Italian cross-country mountain biker. At the 2012 Summer Olympics, he competed in the cross-country race at Hadleigh Farm, finishing in 13th place.

Major results

2008
 1st  Cross-country, National Junior Championships
2009
 1st  Cross-country, National Junior Championships
2011
 1st  Overall UCI Under-23 World Cup
1st Pietermaritzburg
1st Mont-Sainte-Anne
1st Windham
1st Nové Město na Moravě
1st Val di Sole
2nd Dalby Forest
 1st  Cross-country, National Under-23 Championships
2012
 1st  Cross-country, National Under-23 Championships
 2nd Overall UCI Under-23 World Cup
1st Val d'Isère
2nd Mont-Sainte-Anne
2nd Pietermaritzburg
2013
 UCI World Championships
1st  Team relay
1st  Under-23 Cross-country
 1st  Team relay, UEC European Championships
 1st  Cross-country, National Under-23 Championships
2017
 1st  Cross-country, National Championships
 Swiss Bike Cup
2nd Basel
2nd Lugano
 3rd  Team relay, UEC European Championships
 UCI XCO World Cup
3rd Mont-Sainte-Anne
2018
 UCI XCO World Cup
1st Vallnord
2nd Val di Sole
2nd Mont-Sainte-Anne
2nd La Bresse
 Internazionali d'Italia Series
1st Pineto
1st Chies d'Alpago
 Swiss Bike Cup
1st Lugano
 2nd  Cross-country, UCI World Championships
 UCI XCC World Cup
3rd Vallnord
2019
 1st  Cross-country, National Championships
 UCI XCO World Cup
1st Les Gets
 Internazionali d'Italia Series
1st Pineto
1st La Thuile
3rd Andora
 Swiss Bike Cup
1st Andermatt
2nd Basel
2021
 Internazionali d'Italia Series
1st Valle di Casies
2022
 1st  Cross-country, National Championships

References

External links

Italian male cyclists
Italian mountain bikers
Cross-country mountain bikers
Living people
Olympic cyclists of Italy
Cyclists at the 2012 Summer Olympics
Sportspeople from Brixen
Cyclists at the 2015 European Games
European Games competitors for Italy
1991 births
Cyclists at the 2020 Summer Olympics
Cyclists from Trentino-Alto Adige/Südtirol